Livermore is a city in Humboldt County, Iowa, United States. The population was 381 at the time of the 2020 census. Livermore is the hometown of former University of Iowa and NFL tight end Dallas Clark.

History

Livermore was founded in 1879. The community grew in importance as an agricultural center with grain elevators and feed mills and merchants serving the surrounding rich farmland. The community is located adjacent to the confluence of the East Fork Des Moines River and Lott's Creek. Early industries included a brick and tile factory and agricultural products processing. As north central Iowa's rural population dwindled, so has Livermore's population. Its remaining elementary school closed in 2005.

Geography
Livermore is located at  (42.866849, -94.184051) at the confluence of Lotts Creek with the East Fork Des Moines River.

Climate
Livermore has a humid continental climate (Köppen Dfa), including all four seasons characterized by harsh winters, and mild summers.

Temperatures above  are uncommon.

Demographics

2010 census
As of the census of 2010, there were 384 people, 164 households, and 106 families residing in the city. The racial makeup of the city was 96.9% White, 0.5% African American, 0.3% Native American, 1.0% from other races, and 1.3% from two or more races. Hispanic or Latino of any race were 2.3% of the population.

There were 164 households, of which 28.0% had children under the age of 18 living with them, 49.4% were married couples living together, 8.5% had a female householder with no husband present, 6.7% had a male householder with no wife present, and 35.4% were non-families. 29.3% of all households were made up of individuals, and 14.6% had someone living alone who was 65 years of age or older. The average household size was 2.34 and the average family size was 2.83.

The median age in the city was 41 years. 24.5% of residents were under the age of 18; 3.8% were between the ages of 18 and 24; 27.1% were from 25 to 44; 28.7% were from 45 to 64; and 15.9% were 65 years of age or older. The gender makeup of the city was 49.7% male and 50.3% female.

2000 census
As of the census of 2000, there were 431 people, 183 households, and 109 families residing in the city. The racial makeup of the city was 99.77% White and 0.23% Pacific Islander. Hispanic or Latino of any race were 0.46% of the population.

There were 183 households, out of which 29.5% had children under the age of 18 living with them, 45.9% were married couples living together, 7.7% had a female householder with no husband present, and 39.9% were non-families. 35.0% of all households were made up of individuals, and 23.0% had someone living alone who was 65 years of age or older. The average household size was 2.35 and the average family size was 2.94.

In the city, the population was spread out, with 23.9% under the age of 18, 8.4% from 18 to 24, 25.5% from 25 to 44, 24.1% from 45 to 64, and 18.1% who were 65 years of age or older. The median age was 42 years. For every 100 females, there were 89.0 males. For every 100 females age 18 and over, there were 95.2 males.

The median income for a household in the city was $26,328, and the median income for a family was $32,411. Males had a median income of $25,789 versus $19,583 for females. The per capita income for the city was $13,714. About 10.6% of families and 12.6% of the population were below the poverty line, including 7.2% of those under age 18 and 14.5% of those age 65 or over.

Education
It is within the Twin Rivers Community School District.

Community

With a sizeable German Catholic population surrounding Livermore, the community's largest church is Sacred Heart Catholic, followed by Livermore United Methodist and Immanuel Lutheran. Bethel Presbyterian Church closed in the late 1970s and the building is now home to the Livermore Community Club and museum. Other community attractions include Old Settlers' Park, which dates to 1890, when early Livermore families each contributed a log to build a cabin in the thickly wooded park located at the west entrance to the community. The town also features a library, community swimming pool and a high school baseball/softball complex. Just north of Livermore is the picturesque Spring Valley Golf Club, named Iowa's best nine-hole course, before it was expanded to 18 holes. Otto Field American Legion Post 415 is located in Livermore and the town's Friends & Neighbors Club is an active seniors organization with its own building. Livermore Daze is an annual celebration that brings together antique car enthusiasts, parade participants and hundreds of residents and visitors to the weekend event.

Notable person

Dallas Clark (1979– ) football player for the University of Iowa Hawkeyes and Indianapolis Colts of the NFL, 2003–2011.

References

External links

 

City of Livermore Portal style website, Government, Business, Tourism, & more
City-Data Comprehensive Statistical Data and more about Livermore

Cities in Iowa
Cities in Humboldt County, Iowa
Populated places established in 1882